Justino 'Tining' R. Romea (Napo, Loon, April 17, 1934– 1985) was a Filipino composer, writer, director, musical arranger, poet and journalist. He composed the Awit sa Bohol or Bohol hymn and many school anthems.

Biography

Born in Napo, Loon, Bohol, who later settled in Maribojoc with his wife Jesusa Dalugdug (also from Napo) and family because they were able to acquire a property there.

Romea taught at the Bohol School of Arts and Trades (BSAT) now CVSCAFT.

Romea was commissioned to pen the Bohol Provincial Hymn. It was first sung publicly by a female choir of the College of Holy Spirit of Tagbilaran City on March 1, 1970, in time for the unfurling of the Bohol Flag during the opening ceremonies of the 1970 East Visayan Athletic Association held in Tagbilaran City.

On September 24, 1970, the Provincial Board passed Resolution No. 215 adopting it as the official song of the province of Bohol.

As the hymn's original version was in English, the Provincial Board, a few years after, endeavored to have it translated into the vernacular. Competition was launched, and the entry of Maxelende Ganade emerged as the best and was adjudged the winner. The Boholano version was adopted by the Provincial Board in Resolution No. 151 dated September 13, 1974.

Romea also composed many school anthems like University of Bohol or UB Hymn, BSAT Hymn, Saint Joseph Institute of Technology in Butuan, and he is best remembered for the love song "Ako Kang Paabuton," the folk song "Sa Daplin sa Baybayon" as well as most of the songs featured in the annual 'drama' presentations in his native Napo for which he served as writer, director and musical arranger.

Nong Tining was also a revered columnist of Bohol Chronicle. In fact, his column was in the frontpage of the Bohol Chronicle defying editing rules.

Father's side

Romea's father Bernardo "Leon" Vidal Romea was a rondalla trainer, scriptwriter, director and musical Arranger for the "Drama" in Napo, Loon, Bohol.

Bernardo or "Pantaleon" or "Leon", as he was more popularly known, was born on March 12, 1895, in Barangay Napo to spouses Marcelo (Oyong Eloy) and Maria (Oyang Iyay) Vidal, a second wife.  His grandparents were Domingo Romea and Cecilia Ordubanes of Barangay Taytay.

After completing his elementary education and the first year of high school, the latter at Bohol High School, he qualified for a teaching post, a feat in those days.  On June 16, 1910, at age 15, he was appointed a temporary teacher in Loon.  A few years later, he passed the teachers' examinations and went on to become principal for 19 years.

Romea's command of the English language was grammatically flawless.  He bought American books and subscribed to local English magazines (e.g. Free Press, Graphics, etc.) hoping that his children would love or develop the habit of reading. They indeed became bookworms and their communication skills improved. His passion for music was such that he composed songs, organized rondallas wherever he was assigned to his teaching career and promoted and participated in competitions.  This went on even after his retirement years.  He could skillfully play any of the string instruments in the rondalla but was at his best with the bandurria.

Romea was keen in distinguishing the slightest discord that at times during rondalla rehearsals, he would suddenly wave a hand for a pause just to tune up a dissonant instrument. Romea was also called a "dramaturgo" for he wrote and directed stage plays or "drama" which always served as the culminating feature of the barrio fiesta celebration in Napo.  In fact, he is acknowledged as the original playwright, director and composer–musical arranger of Napo's stage plays that are now mounted on May 25 of each year without fail.  It is believed that Napo holds the record of staging the longest running series of annual plays in Bohol, if not the whole country.

Songs

Ako kang Paabuton

Music by Atty. Elpidio Varquez Biliran
Lyrics by Justino Romea

Ako Kang Paabuton

Buhi sa kanunay, ug dili hikalimtan 
Ang gugmang gibati ko 
Gi ampingan ning dughan
Bisag gi-yam-iran
Bisan pag gitamay
Molambo UG mo lipang Kay
Ang gugmang matuod Di mamatay

Chorus:
Tohoi intawn ako, 
Salig sa gi saad ko 
Gugma kining way pagkalaya 
Bisan ibanlas sa luha

Kung ang kasing-kasing ko 
Sa palad sakiton 
Didto sa kalangitan  
Ako kang paabuton

Bohol Hymn
(English version)

This is the land I love,
The land God gave to me,
Caressed by the sun, 
Bathed in the sea, 
And kissed by the cool breeze 
Night and day. 
Here’s where the early heroes lived, 
Here’s where they wrought peace and here they bled, 
Here rise the marvelous cone-shaped hills, 
Here’s sweet kinampay grows.

Blessed with white sandy beaches, 
Rivers that water valley, 
Seas teem with fishes and cows graze 
on the plains, 
In ev’ry home love reigns, 
God keep my homeland always free, 
Let her forever be, 
I pledge my strength, my heart, and soul, 
To my close home, Bohol.

Saint Joseph Institute of Technology (SJIT) Hymn

I ask you to join me sing this song 
of prayer for SJIT 
Born out of the midst of the beautiful dream, 
Nursed by the love of its founder. 
Here I set my eyes to find my place 
in the sun, 
here I lift up to the skies my ambition 
to serve God and man.
So, dear Lord, in Heaven,
Bless my dear SJIT 
May it live forever, let us sing, and let us pray.

BSAT Hymn

Let us sing and let us praise the BSAT 
It's the school that trains brind and hand. 
Where the clanging of the anvils, 
the buzzing of the sew 
And the roar of the plainer 
are the song we love to here. 
Where the joys and hopes are waiting. 
Blend in song as we turn the mill 
We are wood and metal workers 
We sew, we cook, we draw and hammer.

All these jobs will make our country 
Strong and free   ( repeat ) 
It's the school that trains brind and hand.
Where the clanging of the anvils, 
the buzzing of the sew 
And the roar of the plainer 
are the song we love to here. 
Where the joys and hopes are waiting. 
Blend in song as we turn the mill 
We are wood and metal workers 
We sew, we cook, we draw and hammer.

All these jobs will make our country 
Strong and free   ( repeat )

Honor
 Singer Bayang Barrios sang the version of "Ako Kang Paabuton."

Sources
 http://www.bohol-island.com/about/hymn.htm
 http://www.bohol.ph/article35.html
 http://www.boholchronicle.com
 http://loon.gov.ph/index.php?option=com_content&task=view&id=112&Itemid=1

References 

20th-century Filipino poets
Writers from Bohol
Musicians from Bohol
Boholano writers
1934 births
1985 deaths
20th-century male writers